The Electoral district of Northumberland Boroughs was an electorate of the partially elected New South Wales Legislative Council, created for the first elections for the Council in 1843. From 1843 until 1851 the electorate covered the major towns or boroughs of Northumberland County, East Maitland, West Maitland and Newcastle,
and polling took place at East Maitland, West Maitland and Newcastle. Morpeth was added to the electorate from 1851 while Newcastle was removed from the electorate to form, with Raymond Terrace, the North Eastern Boroughs.
The rest of Northumberland County was covered by the County of Northumberland from 1843 until 1951,
and Counties of Northumberland and Hunter from 1851 until 1856.

In 1856 the unicameral Legislative Council was abolished and replaced with an elected Legislative Assembly and an appointed Legislative Council. The district was represented by the Legislative Assembly electorate of Northumberland Boroughs.

Members

Bob Nichols went on to represent Northumberland Boroughs in the Legislative Assembly from 1856.

Election results

1843

1845
D'Arcy Wentworth resigned in July 1845.

The election of Patrick Grant was declared void on the grounds that he was not qualified to stand, however he was re-elected unopposed.

1848

1851

See also
Members of the New South Wales Legislative Council, 1843–1851 and 1851-1856

References

Former electoral districts of New South Wales Legislative Council
1843 establishments in Australia
1856 disestablishments in Australia